This is a list of events related to architecture in 1745.

Events

Buildings and structures

Buildings
 The Great Lavra Bell Tower, the main bell tower of the ancient cave monastery of Kiev Pechersk Lavra in Kiev (modern-day capital of Ukraine), designed by Johann Gottfried Schädel, is completed (begun 1731).
 Construction of the Wieskirche in Bavaria, designed by Dominikus Zimmermann, is begun (structure completed 1754)

Births
May 5 – Carl August Ehrensvärd, Swedish naval officer, painter, author and neoclassical architect (died 1800)
July 20 – Henry Holland, English architect (died 1806)
Pierre-Adrien Pâris, French architect, painter and designer (died 1819)

Deaths
 February 23 – Joseph Effner, German architect and decorator (born 1687)
 June 13 – Domenico Antonio Vaccaro, Neapolitan painter, sculptor and architect (died 1678)
 October 15 – Maximilian von Welsch, German baroque architect (born 1671)
 November 16 – Johann Lukas von Hildebrandt, Genoese-born, Italian-trained Austrian baroque architect (born 1668)

References 

Architecture
Years in architecture
18th-century architecture